Ryōkichi, Ryokichi, Ryoukichi or Ryohkichi (written:  or ) is a masculine Japanese given name. Notable people with the name include:

, Japanese politician
, Japanese botanist

Japanese masculine given names